Henry John Fanshawe Badeley, 1st Baron Badeley, KCB, CBE (27 June 1874 – 27 September 1951), known as Sir Henry Badeley between 1935 and 1949, was a British civil servant and engraver. He was Clerk of the Parliaments from 1934 to 1949.

Early life
Badeley was born at Elswick, near Newcastle-upon-Tyne, the son of Captain Henry Badeley, originally of Guy Harlings, Chelmsford, Essex, and was educated at Radley College and Trinity College, Oxford. (Captain Henry Badeley's father was John Carr Badeley (1794–1851), MD, FRCP.)

Career

Badeley entered the Parliament Office in 1897 and was Principal Clerk and Taxing Officer at the Judicial Department of the House of Lords from 1919 to 1930. He was appointed a Commander of the Order of the British Empire (CBE) in 1920 and became Assistant Clerk of the Parliaments in 1930. In 1934 he was promoted to Clerk of the Parliaments, an office he held until 1949. He was made a Knight Commander of the Order of the Bath (KCB) in 1935 and elevated to the peerage as Baron Badeley, of Badley in the County of Suffolk, in 1949. After his retirement the Marquess of Salisbury said of him: "He could almost be described as the father of the house, for he had been the guide, philosopher and friend to whom they had gone in their troubles". He was a regular contributor in the House of Lords during his two years as a member.

Apart from his career in the civil service Badeley was a noted engraver. He studied under Sir Frank Short at the Royal College of Art and had his works exhibited at the Royal Academy. He was a Fellow of the Royal Society of Painter-Etchers and Engravers and was Honorary Secretary to the society from 1911 to 1921.

As an engraver, Badeley designed bookplates for many customers, including members of the Peerage. He designed a bookplate for the House of Lords Library in 1910, almost 40 years before his own elevation to the peerage. Many of his bookplates and other engravings survive in library and museum collections.

Death
Lord Badeley died unmarried in September 1951, aged 77, when the barony became extinct.

Arms

References

External links

 Bookplates by Henry Badeley in the University of Delaware Library's William Augustus Brewer Bookplate Collection
Parliamentary Archives, Papers of Sir Henry John Fanshawe Badeley (1874-1951), Clerk of the Parliaments and Engraver

1874 births
1951 deaths
People educated at Radley College
19th-century engravers
20th-century engravers
Alumni of Trinity College, Oxford
British engravers

Knights Commander of the Order of the Bath
Commanders of the Order of the British Empire
20th-century British printmakers
Clerks of the Parliaments
Barons created by George VI